Canadian Idol was a Canadian interactive reality game show series. The series premiered their first season in 2003 on CTV and was on air for six seasons. Based on the American version of the show, American Idol, it is part of the Idol series. Canadian Idol was the most-watched Canadian English-language television series of 2008. The show began with a tour across Canada, in which singers audition in front of four judges: Jake Gold, Sass Jordan, Zack Werner, and Farley Flex. The show was cancelled due to the slowing economy.

The show's age requirements allowed people to enter only if they were between 16 and 28 years of age. During every season, the final round of competition featured ten singers, except for season one when it had eleven finalists. 61 contestants have reached the finals of their respective Canadian Idol season. Out of the contestants listed, 26 of them were under the age of 20, including three winners and four runners-up. Seventeen finalists came from the province of Ontario, while British Columbia and Alberta each had nine. Alberta had the most Canadian Idol winners with three—Kalan Porter, Melissa O'Neil, and Theo Tams; Newfoundland and Labrador had the most runners-up with two—Rex Goudie and Craig Sharpe. Prince Edward Island was the only province to never have had a finalist. There has never been a Canadian Idol finalist from a Canadian territory.  Toronto, Ontario was the hometown for the most Canadian Idol finalists with five, followed by Abbotsford, British Columbia with four. Rob James, Dwight d'Eon, and Drew Wright were 28 at the time their season's final round began, making them the oldest finalists to have performed;  Emily Vinette, Daryl Brunt, Craig Sharpe, and Martha Joy were 16 at the time their season's final round began, making them the youngest finalists to have been in the finals.


Contestants

See also

Music of Canada

Notes
Contestant's age at the time the season's final round began.

References

 General
 
 
 
 
 
 
 
 Specific

Canadian Idol